Network First is a wide-ranging documentary strand broadcast on ITV in the U.K. from January 1994 to December 1997, and was a part replacement for First Tuesday.

Unlike other documentary series on ITV such as World in Action, Network First, was not centred on current affairs or politics, but broadcast a range of one-off programmes covering various subjects such as biography, history, and science. Programmes were usually transmitted in the 22:40 slot after News at Ten, each usually running for an hour. The strand was not "owned" by any one ITV franchise, and individual programmes were contributed by the various ITV companies.

As a strand, Network First never became a household "name" - unlike the likes of World in Action or This Week - possibly because of its diverse subject matter. The series appears to have been dropped quietly by ITV in the lead up to the high-profile axing of both World in Action on 7 December 1998 and News at Ten on 5 March 1999.

External links
 
 Network First at the British Film Institute.

1990s British documentary television series
1994 British television series debuts
1997 British television series endings
British television documentaries
ITV documentaries
Carlton Television
English-language television shows
Television series by ITV Studios
Television shows produced by Central Independent Television